Agdistis manicata is a moth in the family Pterophoridae. It is known from France, Portugal, Spain, southern Russia, Libya and Tunisia. In 2019, the species was found in Azerbaijan for the first time. 

The wingspan is about 25 mm. The forewings are bright grey.

The larvae feed on Limoniastrum monopetalum.

References

Agdistinae
Moths of Europe
Moths described in 1859